is a passenger railway station located in the town of Kami, Mikata District, Hyōgo, Japan, operated by West Japan Railway Company (JR West). It opened on October 25, 1911.

Lines

Station layout
The station consists of one ground-level side platform and one ground level island platform connected by an underground passage. The station is unattended.

Platforms

Adjacent stations

Passenger statistics
In fiscal 2016, the station was used by an average of 388 passengers daily

See also
List of railway stations in Japan

References

External links

Station Official Site

Railway stations in Hyōgo Prefecture
Sanin Main Line
Railway stations in Japan opened in 1911
Kami, Hyōgo (Mikata)